Aleksandar Vuković (born 25 August 1979) is a Serbian professional football manager and former player who currently manages Polish Ekstraklasa club Piast Gliwice.

Club career
He started his career at Borac Banja Luka. Still young, he moved to FK Partizan youth team. Where he played until 2000. While in Serbia, he also played for FK Teleoptik and FK Milicionar. He signed a contract with Iraklis Thessaloniki on 17 December 2008. He retired after a four-year stint in Ekstraklasa side Korona Kielce.

Managerial career
In 2019–2020 he was the Legia Warsaw's coach. He won the Polish Championship in the 2019–20 Ekstraklasa season. He was dismissed in the following season, after quickly dropping out of a UEFA Champions League qualifying and the league defeat at Górnik Zabrze.

On 13 December 2021 he was once again announced as the manager of Legia, following Marek Gołębiewski's resignation a day prior after an defeat to Wisła Płock, which saw Legia drop to the bottom of the league. In his first match after his return, Legia defeated Zagłębie Lubin 4-0 and left the relegation zone. He successfully led Legia away from relegation and finished 10th, eleven points clear of the relegation zone, winning 3–0 against Cracovia on the last match day. On the same day, Vuković left his role as Legia's manager. 

On 27 October 2022, he replaced Waldemar Fornalik as the manager of Piast Gliwice.

Personal life
He was granted Polish citizenship on 13 June 2008.

Managerial statistics

References

External links
 

Serbian footballers
Serbian expatriate footballers
FK Partizan players
FK Teleoptik players
FK Milicionar players
Ergotelis F.C. players
Legia Warsaw players
Iraklis Thessaloniki F.C. players
Korona Kielce players
Ekstraklasa players
Super League Greece players
Association football midfielders
Serbs of Bosnia and Herzegovina
Expatriate footballers in Greece
Serbian expatriate sportspeople in Greece
Expatriate footballers in Poland
Serbian expatriate sportspeople in Poland
Sportspeople from Banja Luka
1979 births
Living people
Naturalized citizens of Poland
Polish people of Serbian descent
Ekstraklasa managers
Legia Warsaw managers
Piast Gliwice managers
Serbian football managers
Serbian expatriate football managers
Expatriate football managers in Poland